Ilian Djevelekov (born 10 May 1966) is a Bulgarian film director and producer.

Career
Djevelekov studied psychology at Sofia University, and graduated in film and television directing from the National Academy for Theatre and Film Arts in Sofia. In 1993, his student film I Want To Be Free won the Best Short Film award at the Golden Rose Film Festival in Varna. From 1994 to 2000, he worked as producer and director at Ku-Ku Film Company. In 2001, he founded the production company Miramar Film, together with Matey Konstantinov and Georgi Dimitrov, which now ranks among Bulgaria's top production companies for feature films, documentaries and TV commercials. Djevelekov has directed and produced tens of TV commercials and documentaries.

Producer
The feature film "Zift" by director Javor Gardev was Ilian Djevelekov's first film as producer of full-length features. The film received Silver St. George award for best director at the Moscow International Film Festival 2008. It was acclaimed at festivals such as Toronto IFF, Melbourne, Mar del Plata, Istanbul, etc. and was sold in Europe and in the US to IFC Films. In Bulgaria it was the most successful domestic release for the past 20 years.

Director
Ilian's first feature film as director - "LOVE.NET" was released in Bulgarian theaters in 2011 and became number one box office hit for the year. Ilian is also producer and co-writer of the film. "LOVE.NET" ranked in the top 10 domestic hits of all time and was selected in competition at Bratislava International Film Festival and the Bahamas International Film Festival among others. In 2011 Ilian received the Best Director award from the Bulgarian Film Academy. Currently Ilian is developing a new film project.

Filmography

LOVE.NET (2011)
Director, Producer, Screenwriter

2010 - Moscow International Film Festival
Nominated - Official Out of Competition Section
2011 - Bulgarian Feature Film Festival Golden Rose
Won - Best Screenplay – Nelly Dimitrova, Matey Konstantinov, Ilian Djevelekov 
Won - Best Actress – Lilia Maraviglia 
Won - Debut Award – Ilian Djevelekov 
2011 - Bratislava International Film Festival
Nominated - Main Competition 
2011 - Kolkata International Film Festival
Nominated - International cinema
2011 - Bahamas International Film Festival
Nominated - Main competition
2011 - Bulgarian Film Academy Awards
Won - Best Director – Ilian Djevelekov
Won - Best Director of Photography – Emil Christov (b.a.c.)
Won - Best Production Designer – Georgi Dimitrov
Won - Best Editor – Alexandra Fuchanska
Nominated - Best Picture
Nominated - Best Actress – Lilia Maraviglia
Nominated - Best Screenplay – Nelly Dimitrova, Matey Konstantinov, Ilian Djevelekov
Nominated - Best Original Score – Petko Manchev
Nominated - Best Costume Designer – Kristina Tomova, Sylvia Vladimirova
2012 - Romania International Film Festival
Nominated - Main competition
2012 - Cyprus International Film Festival
Nominated - Main competition

Cuba is Music (2009)
Director, Producer, Screenwriter

2009 - Sofia International Film Festival
Nominated - Documentary Program Out of Competition
2009 - Temecula Valley International Film and Music Festival, California
Nominated – Documentary Program
2009 - Bulgarian Documentary and Animation Film Festival “Golden Rhyton”, Plovdiv
Nominated – Competition
2009 - International TV Festival “Golden Chest”, Plovdiv
Nominated – Competition
2009 - EastSilver Film Market, Jihlava
Nominated – Silver Eye Award
2009 - World Film Festival of Bangkok
Nominated – Music and Dance Section
2010 - Romanian International Film Festival
Nominated – CineBlackSea Documentary Competition
2010 - CinePecs International Film Festival
Nominated – Focus Section
2011 - International Festival of Films about Music KAMERaTON, Poland
Nominated – Main Competition

Zift (2008)
Producer

2008 - Moscow International Film Festival
Won - "Silver St. George" for Best Director in Main Competition - Javor Gardev
Won - The prize of the Russian Film Clubs Federation for Best Film in Main Competition 
2008 - Toronto International Film Festival
Nominated - Discovery Competition
2008 - Bulgarian Feature Film Festival Golden Rose
Won - Best Film Award "Golden rose"
Won - Best Leading Actor Award - Mihail Mutafov
Won - Best Director of  Photography Award - Emil Christov (b.a.c.)
Won - Best Editor - Kevork Aslanyan
Won - Special Prize of the Film Critics Association 
Won - Best Producers Special Prize bestowed by New Boyana Film
2009 - Sofia International Film Festival
Won - Special Award of the International Jury
Won - Kodak Award for Best Bulgarian Feature Film
2009 - Vilnius International Film Festival “Cinema Spring”
Won - Best Director Award (Special Mention) - Javor Gardev

References

External links
  

1966 births
Living people
Bulgarian film directors
Sofia University alumni
Film people from Plovdiv
National Academy for Theatre and Film Arts alumni